Oraea was the name of a sea port near the modern-day city of Ormara, Balochistan province of Pakistan, important in the Hellenistic era in Indian Ocean trade.  It is mentioned briefly in the Periplus of the Erythraean Sea:

"Beyond the Ommanitic region there is a country also of the Parsidae, of another Kingdom, and the bay of Gedrosia [Casson: “Gulf of Terabdoi”], from the middle of which a cape juts out into the bay. Here there is a river affording an entrance for ships, with a little market-town at the mouth, called Oraea and back from the place an in-land city, distant a seven days' journey from the sea, in which also is the King's court; it is called ... (probably Rhambacia) [Casson notes the name was inadvertently admitted in the manuscript]. This country yields much wheat, wine, rice and dates; but along the coast there is nothing but bdellium." Periplus, Chap. 38

See also
 Makran
 Gedrosia
 Periplus of the Erythraean Sea

References

External links
 Periplus of the Erythraean Sea

History of Balochistan
Former populated places in Pakistan
Populated places along the Silk Road
Gwadar District
Ormara